Narinder Singh   (26 November 1824 – 13 November 1862) was Maharaja of the princely state of Patiala from 1845 to 1862. He was one of the first local rulers to receive the Order of the Star of India and was a Member of the Indian Legislative Council during Lord Canning's Viceroyalty.

Biography
His father was the Maharaja of Patiala, Karam Singh. He succeeded his father on 18 January 1846 aged twenty-three. During his reign the Moti Bagh Palace was constructed at a cost of five lakhs of rupees.

During the Indian Mutiny of 1857, Singh offered assistance to the East India Company and his services were later acknowledged by Lord Canning as being of incalculable value.

He died of fever on 13 November 1862 at the age of thirty-nine. He was succeeded as Maharaja by his ten-year-old son, Mohinder Singh.

Gallery

References

Jat rulers
Indian Hindus
Maharajas of Patiala
Punjabi people
1824 births
1862 deaths
Knights Grand Commander of the Order of the Star of India